Internet Famous is a 2016 mockumentary comedy film satirizing the  Internet celebrity phenomenon. It was written and directed by Michael Gallagher and Steve Greene, and features several real-life internet celebrities portraying parodies of themselves or general stereotypes. It stars a mix of Internet personalities including Shane Dawson, Steve Greene, Richard Ryan, Amanda Cerny, and Christian Delgrosso, as well as established actors John Michael Higgins, Missi Pyle, Roger Bart, and Kevin Hernandez.

It was the only feature film produced by Maker Studios, the online short-form content subsidiary of Disney.

The film premiered on iTunes on June 21, 2016, and subsequently reached No. 5 on the iTunes movie comedy chart. One month after the online release, it was made available worldwide on Netflix starting July 21.

The story follows five internet influencers who attempt to become online sensations as they prepare to attend a live show in which a worldwide audience will vote on which of them wins their own TV show.

Notes

External links
 
 

2016 comedy films
2016 films
American parody films
American mockumentary films
Films about the Internet
Films about social media
Films directed by Michael J. Gallagher
2010s American films